Karl Höger (27 May 1897 – 31 March 1975) was a German football forward who played for SpTV 1877 Waldhof, Bonner SC, SpVgg Fürth and VfR Mannheim. He also represented the Germany national team, winning four caps between 1921 and 1924.

References

External links
 
 

1897 births
1975 deaths
Association football forwards
German footballers
Germany international footballers
SV Waldhof Mannheim players
Bonner SC players
SpVgg Greuther Fürth players
VfR Mannheim players
Fortuna Düsseldorf managers
KSV Hessen Kassel managers
Association football midfielders
German football managers
SV Werder Bremen managers
Hamburger SV managers